The Asia/Oceania Zone was the unique zone within Group 3 of the regional Davis Cup competition in 2019. The zone's competition was held in round robin format in Singapore, from 26 to 29 June 2019.

Participating nations

Draw
Date: 26–29 June

Location: Singapore Sports Hub, Singapore (indoor hard)

Format: Round-robin basis.

Seeding

 1Davis Cup Rankings as of 4 February 2019

Round Robin

Pool A

Pool B 

Standings are determined by: 1. number of wins; 2. number of matches; 3. in two-team ties, head-to-head records; 4. in three-team ties, (a) percentage of sets won (head-to-head records if two teams remain tied), then (b) percentage of games won (head-to-head records if two teams remain tied), then (c) Davis Cup rankings.

Playoffs

Round Robin

Pool A

Vietnam vs. Sri Lanka

Kuwait vs. Singapore

Vietnam vs. Singapore

Kuwait vs. Sri Lanka

Vietnam vs. Kuwait

Sri Lanka vs. Singapore

Pool B

Iran vs. Syria

Qatar vs. Malaysia

Iran vs. Malaysia

Qatar vs. Syria

Iran vs. Qatar

Syria vs. Malaysia

Playoffs

1st to 2nd playoff

Vietnam vs. Syria

3rd to 4th playoff

Sri Lanka vs. Qatar

5th to 6th playoff

Kuwait vs. Malaysia

7th to 8th playoff

Singapore vs. Iran

References

External links
Official Website

Asia/Oceania Zone Group III
Davis Cup Asia/Oceania Zone